Saint-Bonnet-la-Rivière (Limousin: Sent Bonet la Ribèira) is a commune in the Corrèze department in central France.

Population

See also
Communes of the Corrèze department

References

Communes of Corrèze